Windsor is an English surname.  Notable people with the surname include:

Lady Amelia Windsor (born 1995), English model
Andrew Windsor, 1st Baron Windsor (1467–1543), English nobleman
Barbara Windsor (1937–2020), English actress
Bobby Windsor (born 1948), Welsh rugby union player
Claire Windsor (1892–1972), American actress
Devon Windsor (born 1994), American model
Edith Windsor (1929–2017), American LGBT rights activist
Frank Windsor (1928–2020), English television actor
Lord Frederick Windsor (born 1979), member of the British royal family
Sophie Winkleman (Lady Frederick Windsor) (born 1980), wife of Lord Frederick
Lady Gabriella Windsor (born 1981), reporter, member of the British royal family
Gerard Windsor (born 1944), Australian author
Gloria Windsor (born 1935), American model
Harley Windsor (born 1996), Australian figure skater
Harry Windsor-Fry (1862–1947), British painter and educator
Jason Windsor (born 1982), American baseball player
John Windsor (born 1940), American basketball player
Lady Louise Windsor (born 2003), granddaughter to Queen Elizabeth II
Marie Windsor (1919–2000), American actress
Lord Nicholas Windsor (born 1970), member of the British royal family, and his son Albert
Peter Windsor (born 1952), British journalist and reporter
Richard Windsor, American explorer
Robert Windsor (disambiguation), multiple people
Robin Windsor (born 1979), British dancer
Roger Windsor, British labour union leader and former chief executive of the National Union of Mineworkers
Shawn Windsor (born 1963), American man convicted of killing his wife
Tony Windsor (born 1950), Australian independent politician
Walter Windsor (1884–1945), British Labour Party politician
Elizabeth II (1926-2022), Queen of the United Kingdom and other Commonwealth realms

See also
House of Windsor, the house or dynasty of the present British Royal Family

References 

English-language surnames